When Johnny Comes Marching Home is a 1942 musical film directed by Charles Lamont and starring Allan Jones and Jane Frazee. The film is loosely based on the song with the same title.

Plot

Johnny Kovacs (Jones) is a war hero who comes back home for a ten-day leave. Pursued by a woman (Shelton) who considers herself his fiance, he works with his superior officers to hide during his leave. He adopts the name Johnny O'Rourke, and finds a room at a theatrical boarding house. He becomes friends with some other boarders (including O'Connor, Ryan and Gloria Jean) and falls in love with a woman (Frazee). His friends overhear him talking to his officer on the phone. They misinterpret the conversation and conclude that he is a deserter. They push him into giving himself up and returning to duty. Confused by their behavior at first, he figures out what they are up to, and plays along. It all works out in the end. The closing song in the picture is a rousing patriotic number sung directly to the audience by the main players in the film.

Cast
Allan Jones as Johnny Kovacs aka Johnny O'Rourke
Jane Frazee as Joyce Benton
Gloria Jean as Marilyn Benton
Donald O'Connor as Frankie Flanagan
Peggy Ryan as Dusty
Richard Davies as Lt. Tommy Bridges
Clyde Fillmore as Hamilton Wellman
Marla Shelton as Diana Wellman
Olin Howland as Trullers
Emma Dunn as Ma (Norah) Flanagan
Four Step Brothers as Themselves
Phil Spitalny as himself

Soundtrack
One Of Us Has Gotta Go
Written by Inez James and Buddy Pepper
Sung by Gloria Jean, Peggy Ryan, and Donald O'Connor
Romance
Written by Edgar Leslie and Walter Donaldson
Sung by Allan Jones and Gloria Jean
Red Safarin
Performed by the Phil Spitalny All-Girl Orchestra with Evelyn and Her Magic Violin
Jazz Etude
Performed by the Phil Spitalny All-Girl Orchestra with Evelyn and Her Magic Violin
This Is It
Written by Don Raye and Gene de Paul
Sung by Allan Jones and Jane Frazee
Green Eyes
Written by Adolfo Utera and Nilo Menendez
Sung by Gloria Jean
This Is Worth Fighting For
Performed by the (credited) Phil Spitalny All-Girl Orchestra with Evelyn and Her Magic Violin
You and the Night and Music
Written by Howard Dietz and Arthur Schwartz
Sung by Allan Jones, Jane Frazee, and Gloria Jean
My Little Dream Girl
Written by A. Friedland and L. Wolfe Gilbert
Sung by Allan Jones
Say It With Dancing
Written by Don Raye and Gene de Paul
Sung by Gloria Jean, Peggy Ryan, and Donald O'Connor
We Must Be Vigilant
Written by Edgar Leslie and Joseph Burke
Performed by the Phil Spaltany All-Girl Orchestra with Evelyn and Her Magic Violin
The Yanks Are Coming
Written by Harry Seymour
Performed by Allan Jones, Jane Frazee, Gloria Jean, Donald O'Connor, and Peggy Ryan with the Phil Spaltany All-Girl Orchestra

Reception
The New York Times called Universal Pictures "miraculous" for "bringing this star-studded entertainment in under budget and within a 73-minute running time".

References

External links 
 
 

1942 films
American black-and-white films
1942 musical films
Universal Pictures films
Films directed by Charles Lamont
American musical films
1940s English-language films
1940s American films